Albert Avdolyan (born 8 November 1970), is a Russian-Armenian businessman. In 2016 acquired Maltese citizenship through its citizenship for investment scheme. He is specialized in the telecommunication sector. He is the founder and owner of Mobile WiMAX company Expatel and a shareholder of Yota, and is considered one of the key players of 4G technology in Russia.

Early career and personal life
In 1999, Avdolyan acquired 15% of the shares of Russian chemical company Usoliekhimprom. Since 2003, he has also been a shareholder of construction equipment firm Gazkomplektservice, a subsidiary of Gazprom. 

In January 2022, Avdolyan`s "A-Property" company sold to Zhejiang Energy Group 10% in gas projects PJSC "YATEK" and LLC "Globaltec" in Sakha. The goal of the deal is to export LNG to Chinese market according to offtake contract.

Avdolyan is married and is the father of four children. In 2009, he and his wife bought a home in Beverly Hills. In 2011, he bought a second house in the Beverly Park neighborhood. This home was heavily damaged by a fire in the following year.

Expatel
In October 2009, Avdolyan founded Russian company Expatel, one of the Russian leaders in Mobile WiMAX (4G) Internet technology.

In 2010, Expatel had more than 500 retail offices across Russia and was the first Russian company to supply optical fiber services to its customers.

References

1970 births
Living people
Businesspeople in telecommunications
Russian people of Armenian descent
People from Krasnodar
21st-century Russian businesspeople